The Gotha G.VIII, GL.VIII, G.IX, and G.X were a family of bomber aircraft produced in Germany during the final months of World War I. Based on the Gotha G.VII, they were intended as high-speed tactical bombers featuring advanced streamlining for their day.

The G.VIII designation was applied to a single machine developed from the G.VII, with a wingspan extended to 21.73 m (71 ft 3 in) and a revised fuselage. A wing cellule was extended by adding an extra half-bay into it. While no further production ensued, the fuselage modifications were retained on the definitive G.IX. This latter design replaced the new half-bays in the wing cellule with full bays, now bringing the span to 25.26 m (82 ft 11 in). The Idflieg ordered 170 G.IXs from Luft Verkehrs Gesellschaft (LVG) to replace the Gotha G.Vs still in front-line service with Boghol 3. Probably around half of this number were completed before the end of the war, with at least some of them reaching operational status by that time. Following the war, captured examples served for a short time with the Belgian Air Force.

Gotha GL.VIII was a lightweight version of the G.VIII with a compound tail assembly and auxiliary struts supporting the upper mainplane wing-tips.

The G.X was a final variant in the series, intended to be powered by the BMW IIIa, a far less powerful engine than the Maybach Mb IVa used in the G.IX and previous designs. This variant may have been intended as a pure reconnaissance or training aircraft, and it is unclear whether any were built before the armistice.

Specifications (G.IX)

References

 
 

1910s German bomber aircraft
G.XIX
Aircraft first flown in 1918